Karjat may also refer to:

 Karjat, Ahmednagar, a town in Ahmednagar district
 Karjat, a city, a Municipal Council, a Tahsil and a sub-district in Raigad district in the Indian state of Maharashtra
 Karjat taluka, a taluka place in Ahmednagar district
 Karjat taluka, Raigad, a taluka in Raigad district of Maharashtra